The University of Auckland Faculty of Arts is a public university that offers courses in the arts located on Symonds Street, in Auckland.

The faculty is seen as being the best of its kind in New Zealand and in 2007, it was ranked 32nd in the world.

Schools and Disciplinary Areas 
After 2014 organisational reform of the Faculty of Arts:

School of Humanities
Art History
Classics and Ancient History
English, Drama and Writing Studies
History
Philosophy

School of Social Sciences
Anthropology
Development Studies
Media, Film and Television
Politics and International Relations
Sociology

School of Cultures, Languages and Linguistics
Applied Language Studies and Linguistics
Cultures and languages
Intercultural programmes
Translation and Interpreting

Te Wānanga o Waipapa – School of Māori Studies and Pacific Studies
(Focus on indigenous studies related to Aotearoa-New Zealand and the Pacific)
Māori Studies
Pacific Studies

Before the 2014 organisational reform and Subjects:

 Department of Anthropology
 Ethnomusicology
 Archaeological Field Schools
 Archive of Maori and Pacific Musics
 Centre for Archaeological Research
 National Conservation Laboratory for Wet Organic Archaeological Materials
 Auckland Archaeological Society
 RAL – Research in Anthropology and Linguistics
 Polynesian Society
Subjects: Anthropology, Biological Anthropology, Cultural Anthropology, Social Anthropology, Archaeology, Archaeological Science, Conservation, Ethnomusicology, Women Studies
 Department of Applied Language Studies and Linguistics
Subjects: Applied Language Studies, English Writing, Academic English Studies (formerly as ESOL programme), Language Teaching and Learning, Language Teaching, Linguistics, Language and Literature
 Department of Art History
 Museum and Cultural Heritage Programme
Subjects: Art History, Museum and Cultural Heritage
 School of Asian Studies
 Department of Chinese
 Department of Japanese
 Department of Korean
 Indonesian programme
Subjects: Asian Studies, Chinese, Japanese, Korean, Indonesian
 New Zealand Asian Institute
 China Studies Centre
 Japan Studies Centre
 Korea Studies Centre
 Department of Classics and Ancient History
 Lacey Library
Subjects: Ancient History, Classics, Greek, Latin
 Centre for Development Studies
 Subjects: Development Studies
 Department of English
 Centre for Medieval and Early Modern European Studies (MEDEMS)
Subjects: English, Creative Writing, Writing Studies, Medieval and Early Modern European Studies
 School of European Languages and Literature
 European Institute
 Department of Comparative Literature
 Department of French
 Pacific French Research Unit
 Department of Italian
 Department of German and Slavonic Studies
 Research Centre for Germanic Connections with New Zealand and the Pacific
 German Research Library
 Polish Programme
 Russian Language and Literature
 Croatian Language
 Department of Latin American Studies
 New Zealand Centre for Latin American Studies
 Department of Spanish
 Centre for Translation and Interpreting
Subjects: Comparative Literature, Croatian, European Studies, French, German, Italian, Polish, Portuguese, Russian, Spanish, Translation Studies, Interpreting
 Department of Film, Television and Media Studies
Subjects: Film, Television and Media Studies, Screen Production
 Department of History
Subjects: History
 Department of Maori Studies
 International Research Institute for Maori and Indigenous Education
 National Institute of Research Excellence for Maori Development and Advancements (CoRE)
 Centre for Pacific Studies
Subjects: Cook Island Maori, Pacific Studies, Tongan, Samoan
 Department of Philosophy
 Professional Ethics Programme
Subjects: Ethics, Philosophy, Logic and Computation
 Department of Political Studies
 Peace Studies Programme
Subjects: Political Studies, Public Policy, 
 Department of Sociology
 Criminology Programme
 Centre of Methods and Policy Application in the Social Sciences
Subjects: Criminology, Sociology, Social Science for Public Health, Social Science Research Methods, 
 School of Theology
 Auckland Theological Education Group
Subjects: Biblical Studies, Christian Thought and History, Practical Theology, Theology

Arts Programs
Undergraduate programs
Bachelor of Arts, BA
Bachelor of Global Studies (co-ordinate with other various faculties)
Certificate in Languages, CertLang
Certificate of Proficiency, COP
Diploma in Languages, DipLang

Conjoint degrees
Bachelor of Arts / Bachelor of Commerce (BA/BCom)
Bachelor of Arts / Bachelor of Engineering (Honours) (BA/BE(Hons))
Bachelor of Arts / Bachelor of Fine Arts or Bachelor of Fine Arts (Honours) (BA/BFA or BA/BFA(Hons))
Bachelor of Arts / Bachelor of Health Sciences (BA/BHSc)
Bachelor of Arts / Bachelor of Laws or Bachelor of Laws (Honours) (BA/LLB or BA/LLB(Hons))
Bachelor of Arts / Bachelor of Music (BA/BMus)
Bachelor of Arts / Bachelor of Science (BA/BSc)

Postgraduate programs
Graduate Diplomas (bridging programme for postgraduate studies)
Graduate Diploma in Arts, GDipArts
Honours
Bachelor of Arts (Honours), BA
Postgraduate Certificate/Diploma
Postgraduate Diploma in Arts, PGDipArts
Postgraduate Certificate in Advanced Interpreting, PCertAdvInt
Postgraduate Diploma in Language Teaching, PGDipLangTchg
Postgraduate Diploma in Translation Studies, PGDipTranslatStd
Masters
Master of Arts, MA
Master of Creative Writing, MCW
Master of Indigenous Studies, MIndgSt
Master of Literature, MLitt
Master of Professional Studies, MProfSt,
Master of Public Policy, MPP
Master of Teaching English to Speakers of Other Languages, MTESOL

Doctoral program
Doctor of Philosophy, PhD

Bridging Programs
Transitional Certificate (TransCert)
Graduate Diploma in Arts (GradDipArts)
Certificate of Proficiency (COP)

External links
 Official website of the Faculty of Arts, University of Auckland

References

Arts, Faculty of